An impact driver is a tool that delivers a strong, sudden rotational force and forward thrust. The force can be delivered either by striking with a hammer in the case of manual impact drivers, or mechanically in the case of powered impact drivers.

It is often used by mechanics to loosen larger screws, bolts and nuts that are corrosively "frozen" or over-torqued. The direction can also be reversed for situations where screws have to be tightened with torque greater than a screwdriver can reasonably provide.

Manual impact drivers 

Manual impact drivers consist of a heavy outer sleeve that surrounds an inner core that is splined to it. The spline is curved so that when the user strikes the outer sleeve with a hammer, its downward force works on the spline to produce turning force on the core and any socket or work bit attached to it. The tool translates the heavy rotational inertia of the sleeve to the lighter core to generate large amounts of torque. At the same time, the striking blow from the hammer forces the impact driver forward into the screw reducing or eliminating cam out. This attribute is beneficial for Phillips screws which are prone to cam out. It is also excellent for use with the Robertson square socket head screws that are in common use in Canada.

Powered impact drivers 

Typical battery-powered impact drivers are similar to electric drills when used to drive screws or bolts, but additionally have a spring-driven mechanism that applies rotational striking blows once the torque required becomes too great for the motor alone. This shouldn't be confused with the hammer mechanism found on hammer drills, which is a longitudinal blow. Most impact drivers have a handle to make it easier to hold onto. The impact drivers can use on various types of nuts and bolts, and surfaces. This implies that various materials may be used with it, including steel, iron, wood, plastic, and more. It can also use on different types of surfaces. If you want to tighten bolts, you will need an impact driver.

Compared to an impact wrench 
An electric impact driver typically delivers less torque and accepts smaller tool bits than an impact wrench. This makes the impact driver (with its often lesser torque and smaller tool bit) more suited towards driving smaller screws in for example construction work, while the more powerful impact wrench is more suitable for driving larger bolts and nuts in heavy mechanical settings, such as lug nuts.

References

Mechanical hand tools